The  in Groß-Lichterfelde near Berlin, was the main military academy training officer corps of the Prussian Army
from 1882 to 1920. From 1933 till 1945, the building complex housed the SS Division Leibstandarte.

Former students 
 Hans Kahle World War I veteran turned Communist Party of Germany member, NKVD spymaster, senior commander in Spanish Republican Army's International Brigades during the Spanish Civil War, and politician in the German Democratic Republic.
 Manfred von Richthofen (1896-1918), legendary World War I flying ace nicknamed "The Red Baron".

References 

Military academies of Germany
Military of the German Empire
Heritage sites in Berlin
1870s architecture